Dil Ka Kia Rung Karun, is a Pakistani romantic drama serial that was first aired on 1 March 2015. It had 19 episodes. The show was last aired on 10 July 2015 comprising total of 19 episodes. This show starts with Noor Hassan Rizvi, Sana Javed, Aijaz Aslam and Sidra Batool in leading roles. It aired on every Sunday at 9:10 pm.

Cast 

 Noor Hassan Rizvi as Danyal
 Sana Javed as Aizah
 Aijaz Aslam as Dr. Imaad 
 Sidra Batool as Horiya
 Amber Wajid as Zareen
 Emmad Irfani as Shoaib
 Khalid Anam
 Seemi Pasha
 Azra Mansoor
 Mariyam Khalif as Dua (child star)

Plot
The Story revolves around a young girl, who has just started her married life, faces a dreadful accident. The accident left her with the dead body of her beloved husband and a label, "widow." Now, all she can do is to go through the taunts and sympathy, people throw towards her. What will she do to change all this? Will she be able to change her position? Will this male dominant society let her live on her own?

References

External links  
 Dil Ka Kya Rang Karun - Tag
 Dil Ka Kia Rung Karun  Today episode
 Hum TV Official Website

Pakistani drama television series